Stenocoris furcifera is a species of broad-headed bug in the family Alydidae. It is found in Central America, North America, and South America.

References

Articles created by Qbugbot
Insects described in 1842
Alydinae